The Piala Presiden (English: President's Cup) is an annual pre-season association football tournament held in Indonesia and organized by the Football Association of Indonesia (PSSI). It is participated by Liga 1 and Liga 2 clubs. The inaugural tournament was held in 2015 to fill the vacuum of the Indonesia Super League when Indonesia was suspended by FIFA for government interference. The most recent tournament was held in 2022.

History 
The Piala Presiden was a substitute tournament for the Indonesia Super League after PSSI was declared FIFA sanctioned in May 2015. The vacuum of the tournament made Mahaka Sports and Entertainment initiate the President's Cup as a contribution to national football. The first edition of the tournament started with Bali United beating Persija 3–0 in the opening match at Kapten I Wayan Dipta Stadium, Gianyar, Bali, on 30 August 2015. The tournament ended with Persib beating Sriwijaya 2–0 in the final at Gelora Bung Karno Main Stadium, Jakarta, on 18 October 2015.

After the 2015 tournament, the discourse of the tournament appeared in mid 2016. However, the discourse evaporated after Gelora Trisula Semesta initiated a one-season tournament entitled Indonesia Soccer Championship.

In 2017, PSSI, which was freed from FIFA sanctions one year earlier, re-scheduled the 2017 Piala Presiden. The tournament started on 4 February 2017, and was joined by 20 clubs. That year, Mahaka Sports and Entertainment was not involved in the initiation of the tournament.

In 2018, PSSI re-scheduled the 2018 Piala Presiden. This tournament became a Liga 1 pre-season tournament. Persija took their first title after beating Bali United 3–0 in the final at Gelora Bung Karno Main Stadium, Jakarta.

In 2019, the final was played in a two-legged (home-and-away) format and there was no third place match. Arema successfully grabbed their second title after beating Persebaya 4–2 on aggregate in the finals at Persebaya's Gelora Bung Tomo Stadium and Arema's Kanjuruhan Stadium.

The tournament returned for the 2022 edition after a two-year hiatus due to the COVID-19 pandemic. The final was held for two legs and was contested by Arema and Borneo Samarinda, in a repeat of the 2017 final. Defending champions Arema grabbed their third title after beating Borneo Samarinda 1–0 on aggregate in the finals at Arema's Kanjuruhan Stadium and Borneo Samarinda's Segiri Stadium.

Venues

Opening matches 
2015: Kapten I Wayan Dipta Stadium, Gianyar
2017: Maguwoharjo Stadium, Sleman
2018: Gelora Bandung Lautan Api Stadium, Bandung
2019: Jalak Harupat Stadium, Bandung
2022: Manahan Stadium, Solo

Finals 
2015: Gelora Bung Karno Main Stadium, Jakarta
2017: Pakansari Stadium, Bogor
2018: Gelora Bung Karno Main Stadium, Jakarta
2019: Gelora Bung Tomo Stadium, Surabaya (first leg) and Kanjuruhan Stadium, Malang (second leg)
2022: Kanjuruhan Stadium, Malang (first leg) and Segiri Stadium, Samarinda (second leg)

Results

Awards

Top scorer

Best player

Best young player

Fair play award

Broadcasters

References 

Football competitions in Indonesia